The Vagrancy Act 1547 (1 Edw. VI c. 3) was a statute passed in England by King Edward VI. It provided that vagabonds could be enslaved for two years and continued weekly parish collections for the poor. The enslaved vagabonds were to be fed bread and water or small drink and were allowed to be worked by beating, chaining, or other methods the master may choose.  Vagabond slaves were allowed to be bought and sold just as other slaves.  Also, should no private man want the vagabond slave, the slave was to be sent to their town of birth and be forced to work as a slave for that community. Vagabond children could be claimed as "apprentices" and be held as such until the age of 24 if a boy, or the age of 20 if a girl.  Should they attempt to escape this apprenticeship, they were subject to enslavement for the remainder of the apprenticeship.

It was repealed in 1550 by an act which reinstated the 1531 Vagabonds Act.

Footnotes

References
 A.L. Beier, The Problem of the Poor in Tudor and Stuart England (1983)
 
 N Fellows, Disorder & Rebellion in Tudor England (2001)
 Steve Hindle, The State and Social Change in Early Modern England (2000)
 John F Pound, Poverty and Vagrancy in Tudor England (1971)
 Paul Slack, From Reformation to Improvement: Public Welfare in Early Modern England (1998)
 Paul Slack, Poverty and Policy in Tudor England (1988)
 Penry Williams, The Tudor Regime (1979)

See also
 Vagabonds Act

External links
 Vagabonds, etc. Act 1547 at vLex United Kingdom

1547 in England
English Poor Laws
1547 in law
Acts of the Parliament of England (1485–1603)